Waldo is the debut novel of American novelist and travel writer Paul Theroux. It was originally published in 1967 by Houghton Mifflin.

External links
Article about Waldo at Fantastic Fiction

1967 American novels
Novels by Paul Theroux
Houghton Mifflin books
1967 debut novels